Peter  Bulinga is a Kenyan Olympic boxer. He represented his country in the light-welterweight division at the 1996 Summer Olympics. He lost his first bout against Mohamed Allalou.

References

1962 births
Living people
Kenyan male boxers
Olympic boxers of Kenya
Boxers at the 1996 Summer Olympics
Light-welterweight boxers